Nicalis, Inc. is an American video game developer and publisher based in Santa Ana, California. The company focuses primarily on indie games and has developed and published both original games as well as ports of existing games. Nicalis was founded in 2007 by Tyrone Rodriguez, a game designer and former game journalist. In 2017, Nicalis announced that they had acquired SuperVillain Studios and Cowboy Color.

Games
Since its founding, the company has developed and published several games, beginning with Dance Dance Revolution: Mobius in 2008 and Cave Story in 2010. In October 2011, Nicalis announced that it would publish a port of VVVVVV for the Nintendo 3DS via the Nintendo eShop. In December 2011, Nicalis offered both NightSky and Cave Story+ for sale as part of Humble Indie Bundle 4. In April 2012, Nicalis announced that its plans to publish the WiiWare port of La-Mulana in the US and EU had been cancelled, citing a steep decline in the WiiWare userbase. In January 2017, it was silently announced that Nicalis would release several of their games on the Nintendo Switch.

Games developed and published

Games published

Awards
Cave Story was nominated for Game of the Year at the 2010 Nintendo Power Awards, as well as WiiWare Game of the Year. The 3DS version of Cave Story was nominated for Best Adventure Game at the 2011 Nintendo Power Awards. At the 2011 Independent Games Festival, Cave Story was a finalist in the category of "Excellence In Visual Art" and both Cave Story and NightSky received honorable mentions in the category of "Excellence In Audio."

Controversy over management
In September 2019, Kotaku editor Jason Schreier posted a lengthy article compiled from interviews with anonymous internal employees of Nicalis and external developers that have used the company related to the management of the company, particularly to its CEO Tyrone Rodriguez. The investigation was spurred by observations from players of brief conflicts between Nicalis and their developers across social media in the years prior. The report asserted that Rodriguez was controlling and exploitative of his employees and encouraged a racist atmosphere within the company. External developers also stated that they felt Nicalis engaged in ghosting; they had signed deals for Nicalis to help publish their games, but later could not get any response from Nicalis, causing them to lose time and potential sales, and forcing them to turn to other publishers. In response to the report, Nicalis issued a statement stating "We do not condone abusive workplace environments or discrimination and have people from all walks of life." Rodriguez apologized on Twitter that his comments to his employees reported in the article were "indefensible and unacceptable".

On hearing of these accusations, Edmund McMillen, who had developed several games through Nicalis, stated that he would no longer be working with the company on any future games, though The Binding of Isaac: Repentance  would still be releasing as originally planned.

References

External links
Official website

Companies based in Santa Ana, California
American companies established in 2007
Video game companies established in 2007
2007 establishments in California
Video game companies based in California
Video game development companies
Video game publishers
Privately held companies based in California